Carnival Day (Spanish: Días de feria) is a 1960 Spanish comedy film directed by Rafael J. Salvia.

Cast
 Manuel Arbó 
 Pedro Beltrán as Isidoro  
 Juan Bienvenida 
 Pilar Cansino as Rosa  
 José Luis Coll 
 Irene Daina as Maruxa  
 Javier García as Germán  
 Lola García 
 Manuel Insúa 
 José Isbert as Don Damián  
 Tony Leblanc as Camarero  
 Goyo Lebrero 
 Carlos Lucas as Espectador  
 José Luis López Vázquez as Figueroa 
 Antonio Martinez 
 Santiago Ontañón 
 Gisia Paradís as Erika  
 Carmen Porcel 
 Joaquín Portillo 'Top' 
 Jesús Puente 
 Nora Samsó 
 
 Josefina Serratosa 
 Luis Sánchez Polack 
 Ángel Álvarez
 Enrique Ávila as Antón

References

Bibliography 
 Àngel Comas. Diccionari de llargmetratges: el cinema a Catalunya durant la Segona República, la Guerra Civil i el franquisme (1930-1975). Cossetània Edicions, 2005.

External links 
 

1960 films
Spanish comedy films
1960s Spanish-language films
Films directed by Rafael J. Salvia
Films with screenplays by Rafael J. Salvia
1960s Spanish films